Caledonia Farm, also known as Fountain Hall, is a historic home located at Flint Hill, Rappahannock County, Virginia. It was built about 1812, and is a two-story, three bay, Federal style stone dwelling. The original stone kitchen was connected to the north end of the house in the 1960s.  The property also includes the contributing Dearing family cemetery.

It was added to the National Register of Historic Places in 2004.

References

Houses on the National Register of Historic Places in Virginia
Federal architecture in Virginia
Houses completed in 1812
Houses in Rappahannock County, Virginia
National Register of Historic Places in Rappahannock County, Virginia